Rubus kelloggii is a rare North American species of brambles in the rose family. It has been found only in the state of Missouri in central United States.

The genetics of Rubus is extremely complex, making it difficult to decide on which groups should be recognized as species. There are many rare species with limited ranges such as this. Further study is suggested to clarify the taxonomy.

References

External links
photo of herbarium specimen at Missouri Botanical Garden, collected in Missouri in 1933

kelloggii
Flora of Missouri
Endemic flora of the United States
Plants described in 1945
Flora without expected TNC conservation status